Sudha (born Hema Sudha) is an Indian actress who predominantly played character roles in Telugu films.  Born and brought up in Srirangam, Tamil Nadu, she has acted in more than 500 Telugu films. She was felicitated on 31 January 2014, in Bhimavaram, Andhra Pradesh, for her work in Telugu films.

Filmography

Telugu

 Gang Leader (1991)
 Rowdy Alludu (1991)
 Talli Tandrulu (1991)
 President Gari Pellam (1992)
 Aame (1994)
 Hello Brother (1994)
 Bangaru Kutumbam (1994)
 Pokiri Raja (1995)
 Gharana Bullodu (1995)
 Ghatotkachudu (1995)
 Sankalpam (1995)
 Criminal (1995)
 Nethaji (1996)
 Ramudochadu (1996)
 Akkada Ammayi Ikkada Abbayi (1996)
 Subhakankshalu (1997)
 Preminchukundam Raa (1997)
 Pelli Peetalu (1998)
 Srimathi Vellostha (1998)
 Swayamvaram (1999)
 Sultan (1999)
 Preminche Manasu (1999)
 Anaganaga Oka Ammai (1999)
 Na Hrudayamlo Nidurinche Cheli (1999)
 Swapnalokam (1999)
 Ravoyi Chandamama (1999)
 Sahasabaludu - Vichitrakoti (1999)
 Kalisundam Raa (2000)
 Nuvvu Vastavani (2000)
 Goppinti Alludu (2000)
 Pelli Sambandham (2000)
 Vamsi (2000)
 Nuvve Kavali (2000)
 Uncle (2000)
 Tommidi Nelalu (2001)
 Murari (2001)
 Eduruleni Manishi (2001)
 Ammayi Kosam (2001)
 Ninnu Choodalani (2001)
 Bava Nachadu (2001)
 Nuvvu Naaku Nachav (2001)
 Anandam (2001)
 Manasantha Nuvve (2001)
 Ishtam (2001)
 Sivanna (2001)
 Nuvvu Leka Nenu Lenu (2002)
 Kalusukovalani (2002)
 Santosham (2002)
 Allari (2002)
 Sreeram (2002)
 Holi (2002)
 Nuvve Nuvve (2002)
 Nee Sneham (2002)
 Yuva Rathna (2002)
 Manmadhudu (2002)
 Naaga (2003)
 Dil (2003)
 Ottesi Cheputunna (2003)
 Appudappudu (2003)
 Ninne Ishtapaddanu (2003)
 Oka Raju Oka Rani (2003)
 Janaki Weds Sriram (2003)
 Premayanamaha (2003)
 Neeke Manasichaanu (2003)
 Lakshmi Narasimha (2004)
 Nenunnanu (2004)
 Arya (2004)
 Koduku (2004)
 Kedi No.1 (2004)
 Pallakilo Pellikoothuru (2004)
 Valliddaru Okkate (2004)
 7G Brindhavan Colony (2004)
 Avunanna Kaadanna (2005)
 Andagadu (2005)
 Bunny (2005)
 Subash Chandra Bose (2005)
 Bhadra (2005)
 Jagapati (2005)
 Naa Oopiri (2005)
 Athadu (2005)
 Allari Bullodu (2005)
 Bhageeratha (2005)
 Jai Chiranjeeva (2005)
 Sri Ramadasu (2006)
 Pokiri (2006)
 Ashok (2006)
 Maa Iddari Madhya (2006)
 Raja Babu (2006)
 Evandoi Srivaru (2006)
 Madhumasam (2007)
 Classmates (2007)
 Munna (2007)
 Veduka (2007)
 Toss (2007)
 Takkari (2007)
 Krishna (2008)
 Swagatam (2008)
 Mangatayaru Tiffin Centre (2008)
 Bujjigadu (2008)
 Tinnama Padukunnama Tellarainda! (2008)
 Bhale Dongalu (2008)
 Bangaru Babu (2008)
 Ready (2008)
 Ullasamga Utsahamga (2008)
 Deepavali (2008)
 Ekaloveyudu (2008)
 Andamaina Abaddam (2008)
 King (2008)
 Mesthri (2009)
 Fitting Master (2009)
 Konchem Ishtam Konchem Kashtam (2009)
 Ride (2009)
 Boni (2009)
 Current (2009)
 Ganesh Just Ganesh (2009)
 Jayeebhava (2009)
 Namo Venkatesa (2010)
 Shambo Shiva Shambo (2010)
 Adhurs (2010)
 Panchakshari (2010)
 Jhummandi Naadam (2010)
 Don Seenu (2010)
 Khaleja (2010)
 Mirapakay (2011)
 KSD Appalaraju (2011)
 Teen Maar (2011)
 Seema Tapakai (2011)
 Veera (2011)
 Badrinath (2011)
 Dookudu (2011)
 Sri Rama Rajyam (2011)
 Poola Rangadu (2012)
 Ishq (2012)
 Nanda Nanditha (2012)
 Racha (2012)
 Srimannarayana (2012)
 Avunu (2012)
 Okkadine (2013)
 Baadshah (2013)
 Gunde Jaari Gallanthayyinde (2013)
 Greeku Veerudu (2013)
 Emo Gurram Egaravachu (2014)
 Oka Laila Kosam (2014)
 Mantra 2 (2015)
 Right Right (2016)
 Om Namo Venkatesaya (2017)
 Oxygen (2017)
 Mama O Chandamama  (2017)
 Nartanasala (2018)
 Ammammagarillu  (2018)
 30 Rojullo Preminchadam Ela (2021)
 Annapoornamma Gari Manavadu (2021)
 SR Kalyanamandapam (2021)

Tamil

 Oh Maane Maane (1984) 
 Vanna Kanavugal (1987)
 Enga Chinna Rasa (1987)
 Guru Sishyan (1988 film) (1988)
 Kodi Parakkuthu (1988)
 En Thangachi Padichava (1988)
 Manamagale Vaa (1988)
 Thangamana Raasa (1989)
 Penn Buthi Pin Buthi (1989)
Thiyagu (1990)
Vaa Arugil Vaa (1991)
Porkodi (1991)
Kaaval Geetham (1992)
Enga Veetu Velan (1992)
Ponnumani (1993)
 Duet (1994)
 Dear Son Maruthu (1995)
 Subash (1996)
 Nethaji (1996)
 Veerapandi Kottayiley (1997)
 Arasu (2003)
 7G Rainbow Colony (2004)
 Oru Naal Oru Kanavu (2005)
Sillunu Oru Kaadhal (2006)
Kedi (2006)
 Aarya (2007)
Thiruvannamalai (2008)
 Kanden Kadhalai (2009)
 Odipolama (2009) as Vasundhara
 Theeradha Vilaiyattu Pillai (2010)
 Vedi (2011)
 Nanda Nanditha (2012)
 Vedalam (2015)
 Jippaa Jimikki (2016)
 24 (2016)
 Pagadi Aattam (2017)
 143 (2017)
 Thiruvalar Panchankam (2020)

Malayalam
 Aksharam (1995)
 Yuvathurki (1996)
 Thattakam (1998)
 Thachiledathu Chundan (1999)
 Balettan (2003)

Kannada
Gulabi (1996)
Rangoli (1996)
Thayi Kotta Seere (1997)
Meravanige (2009)
Kanaka (2018)
Kabzaa (2023)

Hindi
Aaj Ka Goonda Raj (1992)
Love Ke Liye Kuch Bhi Karega (2001)

Television

References

External links
 

Telugu actresses
Living people
Actresses in Telugu cinema
Actresses in Tamil cinema
Actresses in Malayalam cinema
People from Tamil Nadu
Actresses from Tiruchirappalli
Year of birth missing (living people)
Actresses in Kannada cinema
Actresses in Tamil television
Actresses in Hindi cinema